A New Disease Is Born is the third full-length studio album by the Greek/Swedish melodic death metal band, Nightrage. It was released by Lifeforce Records on 12 March 2007. The album features an entirely new lineup, excluding guitarist Marios Iliopoulos and bassist Henric Carlsson.

A New Disease Is Born appears in the lyrics to the song "Drug" from the previous album Descent into Chaos, which suggests a possible origin for the name of this album.

Track listing

Videography
The album features a video for the song, "Scathing" directed by Bob Katsionis.

Credits

Band members
Jimmie Strimell − vocals
Marios Iliopoulos − guitars
Henric Carlsson − bass
Alexander Svenningson− drums

Guest musicians
Jacob Hansen – end guitar solo in "Reconcile", additional clean vocals in "Spiral", "Reconcile", "Death-Like Silence", "A Condemned Club" and "Scars", keyboards in "Surge of Pity"
 Olof Mörck – second guitar solo in "Death-Like Silence"
 Elias Holmlid – keyboards in "Spiral", "Reconcile", "A Condemned Club", "Spiritual Impulse" and "Ostentatious"

References

External links
 Nightrage Discography page

Nightrage albums
2007 albums
Albums produced by Jacob Hansen
Lifeforce Records albums